Jack Soren is the pen name of Canadian writer Martin Richard Soderstrom, a writer of action-adventure/thriller novels. He was born and raised in Toronto, Canada and he is now a resident of Oshawa, Canada.

Under the name Martin R. Soderstrom, he has published horror and science fiction short stories.

Biographical sketch 
Soderstrom's father was a salesman and his mother was a part-time bookkeeper for a local law firm. He had one younger brother. The family lived in the Toronto suburbs in a detached brick house with a large back yard.

He attended Anson Park Public School and then R.H. King Collegiate Institute. He went on to study Journalism at Centennial College in Toronto.

First novel 
Soderstrom sold his first novel, The Monarch (2014), under the pen name of Jack Soren to HarperCollins. The novel was picked out of the slush pile for the new imprint, Witness Impulse. Soren's editor asked him to turn the standalone thriller into a series. With The Tomorrow Heist (2015) the two books became The Monarch Series.

The digital edition of The Monarch was published in December 2014 and the Trade Paperback edition came out January 2015. The book was translated and published in Germany, Japan, France and the Netherlands.

In June 2015, The Monarch was short-listed for the Kobo Emerging Writer Prize.

Action-adventure novels

The Monarch (2014) 
When Jonathan Hall walked away from his career as an international art thief to be a father, he thought he'd made a clean break—from crime, from life as The Monarch, from an early grave.
But when The Monarch's signature symbol resurfaces, carved into the mutilated bodies of New York's elite, Jonathan realizes his retirement may have been short-lived. Someone is framing The Monarch for horrific slayings. But Jonathan and his former partner, Lew, know this isn't just murder—it's a message.
Now caught in a deadly game against a fanatical madman whose reach penetrates the darkest corners of the globe, Jonathan and Lew have no choice but to play along. But when Jonathan's daughter becomes a pawn, all bets are off. To win this game, Jonathan and Lew will have to accept one final task as The Monarch—a job that could change the course of history forever.

The Tomorrow Heist (2015) 
Jonathan Hall and Lew Katchbrow intended to leave life as international art thieves behind them—if only the money hadn't run out. But when a shadowy organization approaches the duo offering compensation, protection, and prestige in exchange for their skills, Jonathan and Lew think it's an answer to their problems...
 
But the nightmare has only begun.
 
Suddenly Jonathan and Lew are thrust headlong into a race against time and a technology that science says shouldn't exist. With the very nature of life and death on Earth hanging in the balance, it's up to Jonathan and Lew to discover the truth behind Ashita—a terrifying futuristic city in the depths of the Pacific Ocean—and stop it. But the clock is ticking. If Jonathan and Lew fail this heist, millions will die—and the human race will never be the same.

Bibliography

As Jack Soren

The Monarch series 
 The Monarch (2014)
 The Tomorrow Heist (2015)

Stand-alone work 
 Slaybells (novella) (2014)

As Martin R. Soderstrom 
 Roommates (1989) [short story] Tyro Magazine #21
 A Little Matter (1990) [short story] Figment Magazine #5
 The Rabbit Hole (1995) [short story] Deathrealm #25
 Forever Young (1995) [short story] 100 Vicious Little Vampire Stories Anthology
 In the Cards (1995) [short story] 100 Wicked Little Witches Anthology
 Family (1998) [short story] Dark Muse Ezine #1
 The Root of All Evil (1998) [short story] IF Magazine #2
 Empathy's Bed at Midnight (1998) [short story] Horrors! 365 Scary Stories Anthology
 X-Files and Sliders Trivia (1999) [trivia questions] Sci-Fi Channel SF Trivia CD-ROM
 Forever Young (2000) [movie option] Animate 2000, Inc.
 The Find (2000) [short story] Transversions Anthology
 Spark (2007) [short story] Zombies Anthology, Altair Australia Books
 The Pond(2008) [short story] Don't Turn On The Lights Anthology

Awards 
 Forever Young (1996), Honorable Mention, Year's Best Fantasy and Horror #9
 The Monarch (2015) short-listed for the Kobo Emerging Writer Prize

References

External links 

 

20th-century Canadian novelists
21st-century Canadian novelists
Canadian male novelists
Techno-thriller writers
1962 births
Living people
20th-century Canadian male writers
21st-century Canadian male writers